is a railway station on the Wakayama Line of West Japan Railway Company (JR-West) in Kashiba, Nara, Japan.

Lines
  JR-West
  Wakayama Line

Layout

History
It started operation as Goidō Signal Box, a signal box with a crossing loop to exchange trains on the single track Wakayama Line on February 8, 1940. The signal box was discontinued on July 15, 1949, but it was reopened on December 27, 1955. On March 13, 2004, the signal box was converted to a passenger station and the present station name was assigned. Goidō Station on Kintetsu Osaka Line is a separate station. This is why the new JR station was named with the prefix "JR".

References

External links
 Official website 

Railway stations in Nara Prefecture
Railway stations in Japan opened in 2004